The Desert Sands Unified School District (DSUSD) is a public school district with main offices located in La Quinta, California. The district was founded in 1964, after the California Department of Education consolidated all Indio public schools. As of 2017, DSUSD serves 28,958 students in Indio, La Quinta, Palm Desert, Indian Wells, Bermuda Dunes, and parts of Rancho Mirage and Coachella.

History 
In the 1930s and 1940s, Indio Public Schools consisted of Washington, Roosevelt, Jackson, Lincoln and Hoover schools, with the Jefferson school the sole junior high-level facility. In 1966, voters approved the consolidation of the Indio Elementary School District and the Coachella Valley Joint Union High School District, with some smaller elementary districts, into one, 760 square mile, district called Desert Sands Unified School District. The district initially served about 6,600 students.

In 2010, using funds provided by the Magnet Schools Assistance Program, two elementary schools were converted to magnet schools: the Carrillo Ranch Elementary Visual and Performing Arts Magnet School and the John F. Kennedy Elementary Math and Science Magnet School.

In 2016, the school district celebrated its 50th anniversary with an exhibit at the Coachella Valley History Museum, a former one-room school house built in 1909.

In 2016-2017, Desert Sands began offering full-day Kindergarten at all schools (except for Washington Charter) in order to help prepare students and increase reading and writing skills. The expansion was funded by the district's Local Control and Accountability Plan.

In 2017, Students in the Desert Sands Unified School District outperformed the other Coachella Valley school districts on statewide tests.

In the 2018-19 school year, the school district launched a new One to World device initiative titled Connect. Chromebooks are used district-wide for grades 2-12 and the devices are being issued each year alongside textbooks. Students needing a wifi connection at home can also be issued a mifi device to connect to the district's network.

Schools
DSUSD has 20 elementary schools, 8 middle schools, 4 high schools, 2 continuation high schools, an alternative education school, and  
2 preschool programs.

Elementary schools
 Carrillo Ranch Elementary School, Indio – opened in 2003/04.
 James E. Carter Elementary School, Palm Desert – opened in 1996/97.
 Dr. Reynaldo J. Carreon Jr. Academy, Indio – opened in 2004/05.
 Amelia Earhart Elementary of International Studies, an IB World School, Indio – opened in 2001/02.
 Gerald Ford Elementary School, Indian Wells – opened in 1991/92.
 Benjamin Franklin Elementary School, an IB World School, La Quinta – opened in 1997/98.
 Herbert Hoover Elementary School, Indio – opened in 1951/52.
 Horizon School of Independent Studies, La Quinta.
 Andrew Jackson Elementary School, Indio – opened in 1954/55.
 Lyndon B. Johnson Elementary School, Indio – opened January 2000.
 John F. Kennedy Elementary School, Indio – opened in 1964/65.
 Abraham Lincoln Elementary School, Palm Desert – opened in 1965/66.
 James Madison Elementary School, Indio – opened in 1988/89.
 James Monroe Elementary School, Bermuda Dunes – opened in 1987/88.
 Richard R. Oliphant Elementary School, Indio – opened in 2018/08.
 Ronald Reagan Elementary School, Palm Desert – opened in 2006/07.
 Theodore Roosevelt Elementary School, Indio – opened in 1950/51, oldest elementary school in Indio.
 Harry S. Truman Elementary School, La Quinta – opened in 1989/90.
 Martin Van Buren Elementary School, Indio – opened in 1958/59 renovated.
 George Washington Charter Elementary School, Palm Desert – opened in 1954/55.

Middle schools
 Indio Middle School, Indio – opened in 1991/92.
 John Glenn Middle School of International Studies, an IB World School, La Quinta – opened in 2001/02.
 La Quinta Middle School, La Quinta – opened in 1988/89.
 Palm Desert Charter Middle School, Palm Desert – opened in 1978/79.
 Thomas Jefferson Middle School, Indio – the building was a grade school since 1926 and a grade 3–8 school from 1995–2006.
 Colonel Mitchell Paige Middle School, La Quinta – opened in 2005/06.
 Horizon School of Independent Studies, La Quinta.
 Desert Ridge Academy, Indio – opened 2009/10.

High schools
 La Quinta High School – opened in 1994/95.
 Indio High School, Indio – opened in 1958/59.
 Palm Desert High School, Palm Desert – opened in 1985/86.
 Amistad High School, Indio – continuation, opened in 1988/89.
 Horizon School of Independent Studies, La Quinta – opened in 2001/02.
 Summit High School, La Quinta – continuation, opened in 2004/05.
 Shadow Hills High School, Indio – opened 2009/10.

Other schools
 Desert Sands Adult School – online classes.
 John Adams Early Childhood Learning Center.
 Dwight Eisenhower Community Education Center - preschool programs, career technical education, adult education.
 Amistad School in Woodrow Wilson Campus.

References

External links
 

La Quinta, California
School districts in Riverside County, California
Coachella Valley
Indio, California
Indian Wells, California
Rancho Mirage, California